The Municipality of Swan Valley West (MSVW) is a rural municipality (RM) in the Parkland Region of Manitoba, Canada. It is located in the far western portion of Manitoba, along the provincial border with Saskatchewan.

The Town of Swan River is located within the RM, but is a separate urban municipality.

History

The Municipality of Swan Valley West was incorporated on January 1, 2015, via the amalgamation of the RM of Swan River and the Village of Benito. It was formed as a requirement of The Municipal Amalgamations Act, which required that municipalities with a population less than 1,000 amalgamate with one or more neighbouring municipalities by 2015. The Government of Manitoba initiated these amalgamations in order for municipalities to meet the 1997 minimum population requirement of 1,000 to incorporate a municipality.

Communities 
Benito
Durban
Kenville

Demographics 

See also
Swan River, Manitoba

References 

Rural municipalities in Manitoba
2015 establishments in Manitoba
Manitoba municipal amalgamations, 2015
Populated places established in 2015